John Lewis Solomon (born May 23, 1950) is a Canadian public servant and former politician. From 2001 until 2008, he was chair of Saskatchewan's Workers' Compensation  Board. He was previously a provincial and federal politician.

Biography 

Born in Dauphin, Manitoba, Solomon is a former small business operator, and holds degrees in political studies and economics from the University of Manitoba. He also worked for the Canadian National Railway in Winnipeg for three years. He came to Saskatchewan in 1973 and married Janice Lee Bench the following year.

Solomon served as Provincial Secretary for the Saskatchewan New Democratic Party, as executive assistant in the Allan Blakeney government and a corporate planner with SaskTel prior to his election in 1979.

He was a Saskatchewan New Democratic Party (NDP) Member of the Legislative Assembly (MLA) in the Legislative Assembly of Saskatchewan for three terms for the riding of Regina North West, and was elected to the House of Commons of Canada in the 1993 federal election. Solomon served as whip for the NDP in the House of Commons from 1996 to 2000. In an election in which the NDP's caucus fell from 43 seats to 9, Solomon was the only rookie MP elected for the federal NDP.  He served as MP for Regina—Lumsden and then Regina—Lumsden—Lake Centre until he was defeated by a narrow margin in the 2000 federal election.

Solomon served as fulltime chair of the Saskatchewan Saskatchewan Workers' Compensation Board from 2001 to 2008 and has served as a board director for Tiberius Gold Corp and Conexus Credit Union after earning his professional Chartered Director's designation from the DeGroote School of Business at McMaster University.

References 

1950 births
Living people
New Democratic Party MPs
Members of the House of Commons of Canada from Saskatchewan
Saskatchewan New Democratic Party MLAs
People from Dauphin, Manitoba
Politicians from Regina, Saskatchewan